Éloyes station (French: Gare d'Éloyes) is a railway station serving the commune of Éloyes, Vosges department, France. The station is owned and operated by SNCF. It is served by TER Grand Est trains between Nancy and Remiremont (line L04) operated by the SNCF.

See also 

 List of SNCF stations in Grand Est

References 

Railway stations in Vosges (department)
Railway stations in France opened in 1864